The fourth season of the American reality talent show The Voice premiered on March 25, 2013, on NBC and was hosted by Carson Daly, while Christina Milian returned as the social media correspondent. Coaches Adam Levine, and Blake Shelton returned as coaches, both for their fourth season. CeeLo Green and Christina Aguilera appeared as performers instead of coaches. Two new coaches Shakira and Usher served as replacement coaches for Aguilera and Green, leaving Levine & Shelton the only coaches remaining from the inaugural season. The team sizes were trimmed back down to 12 per team (season two's team size), with each coach having two 'steals' in the Battle Rounds.

Danielle Bradbery, a 16-year-old country singer (then-youngest winner of the series) from Cypress, Texas won the season, marking Shelton's third win as a coach.

Auditions, coaches, hosts, and team sizes

Auditions were held from January 12 to February 17, 2013, in Chicago, Atlanta, Los Angeles, Houston and New York City.

Carson Daly hosted for his fourth consecutive season, while Christina Milian returned for her third season as social media correspondent. The judges' line-up saw a change for the first time since the inception of the show. Joining coaches Adam Levine and Blake Shelton were Usher and Shakira. CeeLo Green and Christina Aguilera were substituted in order to focus on their music careers. However, Green and Aguilera would be returning in the following season.

This season's advisers for the Battle Rounds were Hillary Scott (lead singer of Lady Antebellum), Sheryl Crow, Pharrell Williams, and Joel Madden (lead singer of Good Charlotte and coach on Australian version) as advisers of Levine, Shelton, Usher, and Shakira's teams respectively. All advisers except Madden returned to coach on their respective teams during week three of the live shows, so Shakira brought in Green to help coach her team.

Teams
Color key

Blind auditions
Color key:

Episode 1 (March 25)
The coaches performed a cover of "Come Together" at the start of the show.

Episode 2 (March 26)

Episode 3 (April 1)

Episode 4 (April 2)

Episode 5 (April 8)

Episode 6 (April 9)

The Battles 
The Battle Rounds were broadcast from Monday, April 15, 2013, to Tuesday, April 23, 2013. The 'Steals' (adopted in season 3) have been retained, and each coach has two uses to be used throughout the Battle rounds. Six battles (or the outcomes thereof) were included in each episode of the Battle Rounds. For this season's advisers, Adam Levine has picked Hillary Scott from Lady Antebellum, Blake Shelton has chosen Sheryl Crow, Shakira is assisted by Joel Madden and Usher brought in Pharrell Williams.

Color key:

The Knockouts 
The Knockout Rounds aired on Monday, April 29, 2013, and Tuesday, April 30, 2013.

Color key:

Live shows 
Prior to the start of the Live shows, a special episode called "The Road to the Live Shows" was aired for one hour on Wednesday, May 1, 2013, recapping some of the best moments of the blind auditions, battle rounds and knockout rounds.

Color key:

Week 1: Live playoffs (May 6, 7 & 8) 
The live playoffs aired from Monday, May 6, 2013, through Wednesday, May 8, 2013. Contestants were asked to sing a stripped-down version of a song in order to concentrate on the competition. The Monday performances featured Teams Adam and Usher, while Tuesday's shows featured Teams Blake and Shakira. On Wednesday, the two artists per team will advance by public vote, and a third artist would be saved by the coach. Special guests in the audience included Savannah Guthrie and Al Roker of The Today Show.

Week 2: Top 12 (May 13 & 14)
The Top 12 performed on Monday, May 13, 2013, and received the results on Tuesday, May 14, 2013. Usher brought in his choreographer, Aakomon Jones, to help coach the artists on his team. During the performance episode's second hour, host Carson Daly mentioned on the changes made to the iTunes multiplier bonus (which remained at tenfold if the artist's single peaked at the top 100 during the voting period), where only one download of an artist's eligible song per registered iTunes account during the designated voting window will count as a vote towards that week's results. The change was contemporaneously added to the "Vote Help" section of the show's NBC.com voting page. None of the artists reached the top 10 on iTunes, so no bonuses were awarded this week. He also mentioned that the iTunes bonus is only given to those in the Top 10 at the close of voting (10am EST).

Week 3: Top 10 (May 20 & 21)
The Top 10 performed for two hours on Monday, May 20, 2013, with results broadcast on Tuesday, May 21, 2013. Advisers from the Battles (Sheryl Crow, Pharrell Williams and Hillary Scott from Lady Antebellum) return to coach on their respective teams. CeeLo Green takes the place of Joel Madden due to Madden's prior commitments to The Voice Australia. The results show featured a performance dedicated to the people who lost their lives from an EF5 tornado in Moore, Oklahoma. Special guests in the audience included Michelle Rodriguez and Vin Diesel from Fast & Furious 6.

This week's iTunes bonus multipliers was awarded to Bradbery.

Week 4: Top 8 (May 27 & 28)
The Top 8 performed on Monday, May 27, 2013, and received the results on Tuesday, May 28. A special preview for the upcoming season of America's Got Talent was shown during the broadcast of the results show.

None of the artists reached the top 10 on iTunes, so no bonuses were awarded; Bradbery's performance single however, did peak at the Top 10 only after the voting window ended, thus the bonus was not applied.

Week 5: Quarterfinals (June 3 & 4)
Top 6 performed two songs each on Monday, June 3, 2013, and received the results on Tuesday, June 4, 2013. Each contestant sang two songs, one of their choice, and one of the coach's choice. Only one contestant was eliminated this week instead of the usual two. Taylor Swift attended Michelle Chamuel's rehearsal for "I Knew You Were Trouble". Amber Carrington had forgotten the lyrics to "I Remember You" during her performance, though it was not commented on by any of the coaches.

The iTunes bonus multipliers was awarded for Chamuel.

Week 6: Semifinals (June 10 & 11)
The Top 5 performed two songs each on Monday, June 10, 2013, and received the results on Tuesday, June 11, 2013. One song is chosen by their coach, and the other is chosen by the contestant as a dedication to another (The Swon Brothers dedicated their band members past and present, Allen for her children, Carrington for her best friends, Bradbery for her parents and best friend, and Chamuel for her coach, Usher)

With the eliminations of Allen and Carrington, Levine and Shakira no longer have any remaining artists on their teams, with the latter being the first contestant to reach the Top 10 of iTunes and to be eliminated in the same week, and also the first time a pair of contestants who pitted together in a Battle round eliminated on the same week. It also marked the first time that a new coach has coached an artist competing in the finale on his first attempt, as Usher had Chamuel available on his team.

Week 7: Finale (June 17 & 18)
The Top 3 performed on Monday, June 17, 2013, with the announcement of the winner on Tuesday, June 18, 2013. This week, the contestants performed three times: a "defining moment" from a previous performance, a duet with their coach, and a solo.

Six performances reached top 10 on iTunes as follows Danielle Bradbery (#2 & #9), Michelle Chamuel (#3 & #8) and The Swon Brothers (#4 & #7).

Elimination chart

Overall
Color key
Artist's info

Result details

Team
Color key:
Artist's info

Result details

Non-artist performances

Ratings
Season four premiered on March 25, 2013, and was watched by 13.64 million viewers with a 4.8 rating in the 18–49 demographic.  It was up from the previous season's premiere by 1.36 million viewers (11%).

Controversies

Voting controversy
At the beginning of the results show for The Live Playoffs, Carson Daly announced that "inconsistencies" were found in the voting, so votes cast via text-messaging and online would be excluded from the vote count to ensure fairness. Daly brought Jason George, CEO of Telescope, the company that manages the show's voting system, on stage to stress that the exclusion would not have affected the results either way. Reported issues were that voting had closed on the Facebook app and website at 11.30 pm PST (an hour and a half after the show's West Coast airing) when it should have ended at 10 am EST the next day, which may have been a result of too many users voting at the same time.

Adam Levine comment
Upon seeing that his team members Judith Hill and Sarah Simmons had not been saved, coach Adam Levine said, "I hate this country," right before the top 8 results were announced. This brought some angry responses on his Twitter page. He then sent a series of Tweets with dictionary definitions of the words "joke," "humorless," "lighthearted," and "misunderstand" to state that it was merely a "heat of the moment" reaction. Levine later provided an explanation: "Last night’s elimination of Judith and Sarah was confusing and downright emotional for me, and my comments were made based on my personal dissatisfaction with the results."

Artists' appearances in other media
Garrett Gardner and Agina Alvarez sang in the blind auditions of season three of The Voice and failed to make a team.
Rhian and Cara Morgan of The Morgan Twins, Colton Swon of The Swon Brothers, Luke Edgemon, and Agina Alvarez made it to Hollywood Week on American Idol seasons two, seven, nine, and eleven respectively.
Jon Peter Lewis of Midas Whale finished in eighth place in season three of American Idol.
Amy Whitcomb performed in season one of The Sing-Off as a member of BYU Noteworthy, and again in season three as a member of Delilah. They came in sixth place both seasons.
Sasha Allen was a contestant on VH1's Born to Diva.
Mary Miranda was on Estrella TV's Tengo Talento, Mucho Talento.
 After failing to make a team, Sam Alves became a contestant on season two of The Voice Brasil. This time, Alves was able to turn all four chairs. He went all the way to the end, winning the competition on December 26, 2013.
 Agina Alvarez went on to compete on the fourth season of La Voz... México, where she came in third place. She also appeared on I Can See Your Voice as La Voz.
 Mark Andrew auditioned for season 14 of American Idol. He was eliminated in the Top 16.
 After failing to make a team, Sonika Vaid auditioned for season fifteen of American Idol. She finished fifth place.
 Duncan Kamakana would participate in EMA 2017 in Slovenia for the chance to represent Slovenia in the Eurovision Song Contest 2017 in Kyiv, Ukraine. He failed to qualify for the national final.
 After failing to make a team, Brandon Diaz auditioned for season sixteen of American Idol. He made it to the Top 24. He also made an appearance in Season 14 to support his girlfriend, Jackie Foster, in the playoffs.
 Ryan Innes would later appear on the second season of Songland.
 Julie Roberts appeared in a game show Wheel of Fortune aired February 13, 2007 playing for her charity along with a contestant Peter Buccellato. Roberts won the $100,000 top prize during the bonus round, raising a total of $124,250 cash & prizes.

References
General

Specific

Season 4
2013 American television seasons